Charles Henry Smith (November 1, 1827 – July 17, 1902) was a brigadier general of the United States Army who was awarded the Medal of Honor for gallantry in the American Civil War.

Personal
Smith was born in Hollis, Maine. He taught school before the Civil War. He married Mary R. L. Livermore in 1850. She died on December 18, 1897, in Washington, D.C. He never remarried, and died in Washington also, on July 17, 1902. He is buried in Arlington National Cemetery next to his wife. His younger brother, George Washington Smith, served as a 90-day volunteer as a sergeant in Co I, 3rd Massachusetts Infantry, reenlisting in the 18th Massachusetts Infantry where he served from  August 1861 to September 1864.

Military
During the Civil War, Smith was a member of the 1st Maine Volunteer Cavalry Regiment. He was commissioned a captain in November 1861 and took command of Company D. He served well and was promoted to major on February 16, 1863. Promoted again March 26 to lieutenant colonel, he participated in the Stoneman 1863 raid. He commanded the regiment in Col. Douty's absence at Brandy Station assuming command after Douty's death at Aldie June 17, 1863 when he was promoted colonel. He was breveted to brigadier general on August 20, 1864, and took command of the brigade. He ended the war at Appomattox having commanded several brigades and a division.

He earned his Medal of Honor for his actions at the Battle of St. Mary's Church in October 1864. Issued on April 11, 1895, his citation read:

He remained in the army after the war and retired as a colonel in 1891.

He was a companion of the District of Columbia Commandery of the Military Order of the Loyal Legion of the United States.

References

Bibliography

External links
 1st Maine Cavalry Living History Organization
 1st Maine Cavalry Regimental Standard reproduced by Steven Hill.
  History of the 1st Maine Cavalry at Google Books (downloadable for free)
 FamilySearch – 1st Regiment, Maine Cavalry
 The Civil War Archive – Maine 1st Regiment Cavalry
 Maine Memory Network – 1st Maine Cavalry

1827 births
1902 deaths
People of Maine in the American Civil War
American Civil War recipients of the Medal of Honor
United States Army Medal of Honor recipients
People from Hollis, Maine
Burials at Arlington National Cemetery
United States Army colonels
Union Army colonels